Reisch Beer, Reisch Brewing Co was a brewery established in the city of Springfield, Illinois by Franz Sales Reisch in 1849. The Reisch brewery operated until 1920 when it was forced to close because of Prohibition. It reopened in 1933 and stayed open until it shut its doors permanently in 1966. 
Reisch Charities resurrected the Reisch Gold Top Beer brand in March 2019 using the original recipe brewed by George Reisch and Patrick Reisch. Reisch Charities was founded November 2018 by board members George Reisch, Daryl Ponder, Vince Salvo, Jim Reisch and Jeff DeGeal. All of the beer proceeds will be used for Springfield charities focusing on preserving Springfield heritage sites.

See also
 List of defunct breweries in the United States

External links
Tony White's site, great-great-grandson of Franz (Frank) Sales Reisch.
http://www.reischcharities.org

Notes

Springfield, Illinois
Defunct brewery companies of the United States